Sarcothelia is a genus of soft corals in the family Xeniidae. It is monotypic with a single species, Sarcothelia edmondsoni.

References

Monotypic cnidarian genera
Xeniidae
Octocorallia genera